Fallen Stars and Rising Scars is the first album by progressive metal band Wastefall.

Track listing
 Killing of Wolves (04:52)	
 Like Father Like None	(06:06)	
 For What is to be Lost (01:33)	
 Fall of Eva (05:33)	
 Annabel Lee (06:55)
 Confession (02:15)	
 Subroutine (04:32)	
 April's Ruin (05:42)	
 That was all About (07:14)
 One with the Fall (06:44)

External links
Album info on Metal Storm

Wastefall albums
2003 albums